The coffee worm snake (Amerotyphlops tenuis) is a harmless blind snake species found in Mexico and Guatemala. No subspecies are currently recognized.

Geographic range
It is found from Mexico (Veracruz) south to Guatemala (Alta and Baja Verapaz). Earlier sources also include Honduras whereas recent ones do not, the Honduran endemic Amerotyphlops stadelmani was formerly included in this species. The type locality given is "Coban [Cobán, Alta Verapaz] in Guatemala".

Habitat
As a fossorial species, it is difficult to find, but it can be locally common.

Conservation status
It is classified as Least Concern (LC) on the IUCN Red List of Threatened Species (v3.1, 2001). Species are listed as such due to their wide distribution, presumed large population, or because it is unlikely to be declining fast enough to qualify for listing in a more threatened category. The population trend is unknown. Year assessed: 2007.

References

Further reading
Salvin O (1860). "On the Reptiles of Guatemala". Proc. Zool. Soc. London 1860: 451-461. (Typhlops tenuis, new species, p. 454).

tenuis
Reptiles of Guatemala
Reptiles of Mexico
Reptiles described in 1860
Taxa named by Osbert Salvin